Immaculate Conception High School (ICHS) is a Roman Catholic High School for girls in Saint Andrew Parish, Jamaica. About 1700 girls are enrolled.

History 
In January 1858, the Scottish Franciscan Sisters set up a Preparatory and Secondary School for girls at Duke Street in Kingston. The School was dedicated to and named after Our Lady of Immaculate Conception. In January 1879, the Scottish Franciscans handed over the school to the Franciscan Sisters of Allegany. Mothers Paula and Veronica set a high standard of achievement which is today still being preserved.

In the summer of 1858, the school moved to Duke Street. On Saturday 23 October 1937, the ICHS was burnt to ashes in a terrible fire that started a block away at a beauty parlor. The school moved to Old Hope Road (temporarily) and then in 1941, the school acquired the Constant Spring Hotel (which was operated by Niagara Falls businessman Frank A. Dudley and the United Hotels Company of America in 1933.) which is now used for the Immaculate Conception High School, Preparatory School and Convent.

The school was separated into two sections, one section for the English speaking students of Jamaica and the other for French speaking students of Haiti. Due to the lack of Haitian students, the French section has been closed down.

The school was a Boarding and Day School.

Campus 
ICHS is located on a large campus with many facilities including:

 Administrative Block
 Faculty Room
 School Chapel
 Library
 Classrooms
 Performing Arts Centre
 5 Computer Rooms
 Medical Room
 Offices of Guidance Counsellors
 Book Store
 Science Building
 2 Home Economics Labs
 2 Art Studios
 3 Audio-Visual Rooms
 Campus Ministry Room
 Cafeteria
 Music House
 School Pool
 Tennis Court
 Netball Court
 Summer House
 Sixth Form Lounge
 Drama House

Insignia
Motto
Ad Astra Per Aspera "Through Difficulties to Excellence"

Emblem
The Franciscan Coat of Arms.

Uniform
For grades 7 to 11 (affectionately called "white coats"): white short sleeved button down blouse, mid-calf length white 12 pleated skirt, royal blue tie, low brown shoes, brown socks that fold above the ankle, a house pin worn above the breast pocket.
For grades 12 and 13 (affectionately called "blue coats"): a short sleeved blue coat lined with white piping worn over a white A-line skirt (knee length), black shoes, white socks and a house badge to be pinned upon the left collar of their coat.

Colours
Blue, white, black and brown

Clubs and Societies 

The Sport Clubs are: Badminton, Karate, Hockey, Football, Netball, Track & Field, Lawn Tennis, Table Tennis, Swimming, Chess and Lacrosse.

The Service and Awareness Clubs are: Immaculate Conception Environmentalists (ICE), Protecting Animal Wellness Society (PAWS), Scientific Environmental Technological Health, Key Club, Interact Club, Impact Club, Heritage Club, Tourism Action Club , Girls With A Cause, Red Cross Club, Girl Guides, Campus Ministry and Octagon Club.

Other Extracurricular Activities are: Animation and Graphic Design, Modern Languages, Baking, Bible Study Society of the West Indies, Writers Club, Schools Challenge Quiz, Grooming and Etiquette, Debating, The Immaculate Conception High School Symphony Orchestra, Steel Band, Guitar Club, Concert Band, Beginner Strings, The Glee Club (Choir), Immaculate Dance Troupe, Fitness Club, Inter Schools Christian Fellowship , Sixth Form Association , Drama Club, Filmmakers Society, Immaculate Reading Society, Junior Achievers, Photography Club, Science, Environment, Technology and Health Club(SETH), Medical Club, Aviation Club, Robotics Club, Pop-Band and United Nations.

Houses 

There are seven houses:

 The Immaculata House - named after Our Lady of Immaculate Conception. The house color is blue.
 The Franciscan House  named after St. Francis of Assisi. The house color is brown.
 The St. Joan of Arc House - named after St. Joan of Arc of France. The house color is yellow.
The St. Clare House - named after St. Clare. The house color is green.
 The St. Tekakwitha House - named after the Indian Martyr, St Tekakwitha. The house color is red.
 The St. Rose of Lima House - named after the first canonized saint in the Western Hemisphere. The house color is rose-pink.
 The Davidica House - named after Sister M. Davidica, former principal of ICHS. The house color is purple.

Notable alumnae

Politics and Law
 Shahine Robinson, MP for St Ann
 Tracy Robinson, Senior Lecturer in the Faculty of Law,University of the West Indies (UWI) Mona, Jamaica; Rhodes Scholar 1992; member of the Inter American Commission on Human Rights (IACHR).

Sports
 Sanya Richards-Ross, American track and field athlete.
 Alia Atkinson, Jamaican swimmer and Olympian.

See also
 Education in Jamaica

References

External links
Aerial view.
Official school website

Girls' schools in Jamaica
Educational institutions established in 1858
Catholic schools in Jamaica
Schools in Kingston, Jamaica
1858 establishments in Jamaica
United Hotels Company of America